The Neumünster Flensburg Railway is part of the Jutland line, the main north–south rail link through Schleswig-Holstein, Germany. Together with the line to Husum, which diverges in Jübek, and the line to Kiel, which diverges in Rendsburg, it also serves as an important east–west axis between Kiel (on the east coast) and the Marsh Railway on the west coast. It consists of several sections that were parts of the first railways in the current territory of Germany.

Route 
The route passes through predominantly agricultural plains. The line is notable for the engineering structures of the Rendsburg High Bridge and the Rendsburg Loop.

In Flensburg the line has since 1927 run around the town in a big loop on the then southern outskirts of town.
The line connects at its southern end at Neumünster to the Hamburg-Altona–Kiel line and at its northern end at Flensburg to the line to Denmark. In between its main hubs are at Rendsburg station (where the line to Kiel branches off), Jübek station (where the line to Husum branches off) and Schleswig station.

Operation and history

Formation 
The line gained its current form after the annexation of the Duchy of Schleswig by Prussia following the after the Second Schleswig War of 1864 and Austro-Prussian War of 1866, and contains sections built for other purposes.

An approximately 34 km-long line, financed by regional stakeholders as the Rendsburg-Neumünster Railway Company, and opened on 18 September 1845. On 1 January 1864 it was integrated in the network of the Altona-Kiel Railway Company (Altona-Kieler Eisenbahn-Gesellschaft).

On 1 April 1854 the Flensburg–Husum–Tönning Railway Company (Flensburg-Husum-Tönninger Eisenbahngesellschaft) opened a line from Tönning on the North Sea to a station located outside Flensburg at Holzkrug; on 4 October the company added a terminus in Flensburg, later called the English Station (Englischer Bahnhof). This station was at the south end of Flensburg Fjord in the Flensburg old town and was formally handed over for operations on 25 October by the Danish king, Frederik VII. The line was built by the British firm of Samuel Morton Peto mainly for the transport of live cattle to England. This company also built the port railways in Flensburg and Tonning in 1854. On 25 October 1854, the company opened a 40 km-long branch was from Flensburg–Husum–Tönning line at Ohrstedt to Rendsburg via Owschlag. This line passed to the west of the town of Schleswig and further south through Klosterkrug.

Schleswig was connected to Klosterkrug with a five kilometre-long branch line on 2 June 1858. Following the annexation of the Duchy of Schleswig by Prussia, the Altona-Kiel Railway opened a 23 km-long line in 1869 from Klosterkrug to Jübek and Eggebek via Schleswig-Friedrichberg (partly using the branch line opened in 1858), which was 17 km shorter that the old route via Ohrstedt. A short cut was built from Jübek to the line from Flensburg to Husum, which is now part of the Husum–Kiel line and the section of the Flensburg–Husum–Tönning Railway running southwest of Eggebek towards Ohrstedt was abandoned, as was the Schleswig Railways line from Klosterkrug to Ohrstedt.

On 26 March 1898, the Prussian State Railways opened the Rendsburg port railway on the then Kaiser-Wilhelm Canal, now the Kiel Canal. In preparation for the widening of the canal, the Rendsburg High Bridge was built and commissioned with a large loop so that the existing Rendsburg station could still be used; they were formally opened on 1 December 1913.

Current Operation

Long-distance services 
An InterCity train run on Fridays from Flensburg to Munich and Cologne, stopping at Schleswig, Rendsburg, Neumünster. On Sundays IC trains run from Berlin and Schwarzach-St. Veit (Austria) to Flensburg.

Regional services 
The DB Regionalbahn Schleswig Holstein operates hourly Regional-Express services between Neumünster and Flensburg. It also operates hourly services on the Husum–Kiel route with modern train trains. During Kiel Week services on this route increase substantially and some locomotive-hauled trains are operated.

Freight traffic 
This line is part of the main route for freight from Germany to Denmark and Sweden. From 2011, trains up to 835 metres long run regularly on the line.

References

Footnotes

Sources
 
 

Railway lines in Schleswig-Holstein
Railway lines opened in 1845